Habrosyne indica is a moth in the family Drepanidae. It is found from India to Taiwan and Japan.

The wingspan is 40–46 mm.

Subspecies
Habrosyne indica indica (Japan, India, Nepal, Myanmar, Vietnam, Thailand, China: Heilongjiang, Jilin, Hebei, Henan, Shaanxi, Zhejiang, Hubei, Jiangxi, Hunan, Fujian, Guangdong, Guangxi, Sichuan, Yunnan, Tibet)
Habrosyne indica formosana Werny, 1966 (Taiwan)

References

Moths described in 1867
Thyatirinae
Moths of Japan